The Roman Catholic Diocese of Ngong is a diocese located in the city of Ngong in the Ecclesiastical province of Nairobi in Kenya.

History
 20 October 1959: Established as Apostolic Prefecture of Ngong from Metropolitan Archdiocese of Nairobi and Diocese of Kisumu
 9 December 1976: Promoted as Diocese of Ngong

Leadership
 Prefects Apostolic of Ngong (Roman rite)
 Father Joannes de Reeper, M.H.M. (1960–1964), appointed Bishop of Kisumu
 Father Colin Cameron Davies, M.H.M. (1964–1976); see below
 Bishops of Ngong (Roman rite)
 Bishop Colin Cameron Davies, M.H.M. (1976–2002); see above
 Bishop Cornelius Schilder, M.H.M. (2002–2009)
 Bishop John Oballa Owaa (2012-)

See also
Roman Catholicism in Kenya
Very Rev. Fr. John Oballa Owaa named the New Bishop of Ngong Diocese, Kenya on 7 January 2012. The diocese had been vacant since the resignation of Bishop Cornelius Schilder, M.H.M. in August 2009. Bishop-elect John Oballa Owaa has up to this date been the Rector of St. Thomas Aquinas Seminary, Nairobi - Kenya. This message was received with joy and gladness by the Seminary Staff and the Seminarians. He was Ordained a priest of Kisumu (Arch-Diocese), Kenya on 28 August 1986.  Bishop-elect John Oballa Owaa will be consecrated on 14 April 2012.

Sources
 GCatholic.org
 Catholic Hierarchy

Roman Catholic dioceses in Kenya
Christian organizations established in 1959
Roman Catholic dioceses and prelatures established in the 20th century
Roman Catholic Ecclesiastical Province of Nairobi